Ipomoea pulcherrima is a species of plant in the family Convolvulaceae. It is endemic to Peru.

References

Endemic flora of Peru
pulcherrima
Vulnerable plants
Taxonomy articles created by Polbot